Pradosh Ranjan Paul (born 21 December 2000) is an Indian cricketer. He made his first-class debut for Tamil Nadu in the 2018–19 Ranji Trophy on 7 January 2019. He made his List A debut on 26 February 2021, for Tamil Nadu in the 2020–21 Vijay Hazare Trophy.

References

External links
 

2000 births
Living people
Indian cricketers
Tamil Nadu cricketers
Place of birth missing (living people)